The Antequerinae are a subfamily of the Cosmopterigidae. In the Nearctic, the subfamily consists of eight species in four genera, found in North America and England.

Genera 
Alloclita 
Antequera
Chalcocolona Meyrick, 1921
Cnemidolophus Walsingham, 1881
Cosmiosophista
Euclemensia
Gibeauxiella
Lamachaera Meyrick, 1915
Limnaecia (or placed in Cosmopteriginae)
Macrobathra Meyrick, 1883 (or placed in Cosmopteriginae)
Meleonoma Meyrick, 1914 (or placed in Cosmopteriginae)
Pancalia
Phosphaticola Viette, 1951

References 

 
Cosmopterigidae
Moth subfamilies